Kidsgrove is a town in the borough of Newcastle-under-Lyme, Staffordshire, England, on the Cheshire border. It is part of the Potteries Urban Area, along with Stoke-on-Trent and Newcastle-under-Lyme. It has a population of 26,276 (2019 census). Most of the town is in the Kidsgrove ward, whilst the western part is in Ravenscliffe.

History

From the 18th century, Kidsgrove grew around coal mining, although the pits have now closed. Clough Hall Mansion in the town is now demolished.

The engineer James Brindley cut the first Harecastle Tunnel on the Trent and Mersey Canal near the town; Thomas Telford cut the second. Kidsgrove also marks the southern extremity of the Macclesfield Canal. There is a legend regarding a headless ghost that is said to haunt the Harecastle Tunnel. The ghost is said to be that of a young woman who was murdered inside the tunnel. She is referred to as the "Kidsgrove Boggart".

R.J. Mitchell, the designer of the Spitfire fighter aircraft, was born in Butt Lane, Kidsgrove.

Kidsgrove was made an urban district in 1904 with the abolition of the Wolstanton Rural District, including the parishes of Kidsgrove and Newchapel. Talke, previously part of the Audley Urban District, was added in 1932. 

Kidsgrove is served by Kidsgrove railway station which was opened by the North Staffordshire Railway on 9 October 1848 as Harecastle, later becoming Kidsgrove Central. This railway station is still open as a junction (now Kidsgrove). However, there were two other stations on the closed loop line namely Kidsgrove Liverpool Road, opened 15 November 1875 and Market Street Halt, opened 1 July 1909.

In 1975, kidnapping victim Lesley Whittle was kept in Bathpool Park, south of Kidsgrove, in an air ventilation shaft from a disused coal mine. She was kept in the shaft for several weeks, with a noose around her neck, and was hanged. Donald Neilson, the killer known as the "Black Panther," was later convicted of murdering her after repeated delays in getting the ransom.

The town has a library, post office, health centre (just outside of the main town), bank and supermarket (Tesco, Lidl, Aldi). Market Street has a Home Bargains, smaller shops and many fast food restaurants. Schools include The King's Church of England Academy, Kidsgrove Secondary School known more locally as Maryhill High School, Kidsgrove Primary School known more locally as Maryhill Primary School, St John's Catholic School and others.

The town used to house the English Electric site on West Avenue, Nelson Industrial Estate. Over the years it went through various name changes: GEC, CEGELEC, Alstom, Converteam before finally General Electric. GE closed the Kidsgrove site in 2016 and the last remaining original building has since been demolished, leaving only the recently erected warehouse which is now under use of another company.

Transport
The First Potteries Bus Route numbers 7/7A, 3 and 4A buses each have terminuses in Kidsgrove, and the railway connects Kidsgrove railway station with Crewe, Manchester and Stoke-on-Trent. The Trent and Mersey Canal runs through the town. Kidsgrove is also home to a portion of the A50 road and is very close to the A34 and the A500.

Sport
Kidsgrove Athletic F.C. play in the Northern Premier League Division One South.

Kidsgrove has a rugby club and a cricket club.

Kidsgrove Scouts
Kidsgrove is home to the 1st Kidsgrove Scout Group in the district of Potteries North and were established in 1910. The group has undertaken regular tours to the DCA World Championships in the US.

Local governance
Kidsgrove is situated in North West Staffordshire on the Cheshire border and is part of the Borough of Newcastle-under-Lyme.

The Wards of Kidsgrove & Ravenscliffe, Butt Lane & Talke and Newchapel & Mow Cop are in the Stoke-on-Trent North Parliamentary Constituency represented by Jonathan Gullis and whilst parts of Mow Cop currently sit within Staffordshire Moorlands Parliamentary Constituency, whose M.P. is Karen Bradley, the area would move into Stoke-on-Trent North under the Boundary Review currently underway.

Kidsgrove has a Town Council of twenty members, separated into four Wards, Talke and Butt Lane, Kidsgrove Central & Ravenscliffe, Hardings Wood and Newchapel & Mow Cop. Kidsgrove Town Council was created in 1974 when Kidsgrove Urban District Council was abolished when the area was absorbed by Newcastle Under Lyme Borough Council under the Local Government Act 1972. Kidsgrove has a mayor who is elected by the Town Council every 12 months. This position is mainly a civic role, and the Mayor acts as an ambassador for Kidsgrove. Kidsgrove Town Council is based at Kidsgrove Town Hall.

Rotary Kidsgrove

Founded on 15 January 1969 and presented with its charter on 2 July the same year, the Rotary Club of Kidsgrove (RCK) has been active within the community whether fundraising, volunteering or helping out local projects for over 50 years. The club is also part of District 1210 within Rotary International in Britain and Ireland.

Originally meeting in the Masonic Hall and Institute in the town, the group now gets together at the Red Bull, Church Lawton.

During November RCK hold a bonfire night and fireworks at Clough Hall Park and during December they can be seen on the streets of Kidsgrove with their Santa float, collecting for local good causes.

In April 2012 RCK were also announced as the Rotary International in Britain and Ireland winners of the Club Online Presence Award. This was the first time the award has been presented and recognises the achievements the group have made through their website and a variety of social media avenues in the year.

Notable people

 Frank William Bentley (1886–1958), English footballer who mainly played for Tottenham Hotspur and Brentford F.C.
 Percy Brooke (1893–1971), English footballer who played mainly for Aberdare Athletic
 R. J. Mitchell (1895–1937), designer of the RAF's Battle of Britain fighter, the Spitfire, was born in Butt Lane village, Kidsgrove.
 Samuel "Sam" Johnson (1901–1975) English footballer who played for York City F.C. and Stoke City F.C.
 Brewster Mason (1922–1987), RSC actor
 Stanley James "Stan" Smith (1931–2010) English footballer. He spent 1950 to 1957 with Port Vale F.C.
 Ken Higgs (1937–2016), England Test cricketer.
 Mark Bright (born 1962), footballer, sports pundit, attended Maryhill High School, Kidsgrove.

See also
Listed buildings in Kidsgrove

References

External links
Kidsgrove.info Website

 
Towns in Staffordshire
Borough of Newcastle-under-Lyme